A species is one of the basic units of biological classification.

Species may also refer to:

Films
The Species film series
 Species (franchise)
 Species (film), a 1995 science fiction/horror film
 Species II, the sequel to Species
 Species III, a direct-to-video sequel
 Species: The Awakening, a Sci-Fi channel direct-to-video sequel

Music
Species (EP) by Japanese metal band Crossfaith
Species counterpoint, a way of teaching Counterpoint.

Other
 Cloud species, in meteorology, the taxonomic rank below the genus level of cloud classification
 Chemical species, a common name for atoms, molecules, molecular fragments, ions, etc.
 Combinatorial species, an abstract, systematic method for analysing discrete structures in terms of generating functions
 Mineral species, minerals that differ in chemical composition and/or crystal structure
 Species, the forms (bread and wine) of the Eucharist, especially in discussion of transubstantiation

See also
 Species problem, a mixture of difficult, related questions that often come up when biologists identify species
 Specie (disambiguation), an unrelated term used to refer to coins